Svistovka is a rural locality (a selo) and the administrative center of Svistovskoye Rural Settlement, Rovensky District, Belgorod Oblast, Russia. The population was 582 as of 2010. There are 4 streets.

Geography 
Svistovka is located 24 km north of Rovenki (the district's administrative centre) by road. Yaseny is the nearest rural locality.

References 

Rural localities in Rovensky District, Belgorod Oblast